James Loach (born 6 June 1969) is a British film director.

Early life
Jim Loach was born in London to Ken Loach and Lesley Ashton in June 1969, one of five children. He studied philosophy at University College London.

Career
Loach intended to pursue a career in journalism. He joined the BBC where he worked as a researcher for Sue Lawley and Anne Robinson. He turned to directing in 1996 while working on the Granada TV current affairs programme World in Action. He went on to direct several episodes of Coronation Street in 2000, and subsequently directed episodes of Bad Girls, Waterloo Road, Shameless and Hotel Babylon.

His first feature film Oranges and Sunshine was released on 1 April 2011. The film starred Emily Watson as Margaret Humphreys, the social worker who exposed the scandal of child migration. It co-starred Hugo Weaving and David Wenham.

In 2012, Loach directed Life of Crime, a thriller written by Declan Croghan. It centred on a young police officer's obsession with the killer of a young girl. Hayley Atwell played the lead part, supported by Richard Coyle and Con O'Neill. It transmitted on ITV to positive reviews in May 2013.

In June 2015, Loach started production on his second film, Measure of a Man. Based on the coming-of-age novel One Fat Summer by Robert Lipsyte, the screenplay was written by David Scearce. The cast included Donald Sutherland, Judy Greer, Luke Wilson and Blake Cooper. The film was released nationwide in the United States on 11 May 2018 and sharply divided critics. 

Michael O'Sullivan from The Washington Post gave the film a 3.5 out of 4 stars and said, "Measure of a Man is a funny, wise movie about bullying that speaks to kids and grown-ups alike".[9] Richard Roeper at The Chicago Sun-Times gave it a 3.5 out of 4 stars and said, "It's a sweet and knowing and lovely and funny story, but occasionally the spell of warm nostalgia is broken by painful moments of family heartbreak and cruel bullying".[10] By contrast, Mick LaSalle at the San Francisco Chronicle gave a critical review, describing it as a film of "gestures and feints".[12]  The film received its European premiere at the Rome Film Festival in October 2018.

In 2019, Loach directed Save Me Too, the sequel to Save Me, written by and starring Lennie James. The cast also featured Stephen Graham, Suranne Jones, Lesley Manville, Jason Flemyng, Kerry Godliman and Susan Lynch.
The series transmitted to very positive reviews in April 2020 in the UK on Sky Atlantic, and later on Peacock (streaming service), a division of NBCUniversal, in the United States, and Loach went on to win a BAFTA for Best Drama Series in 2021.
Work on a second as-yet-untitled New Zealand-set film collaboration with Rona Munro is reportedly under way.

Filmography

References

External links
  Jim Loach's profile at Curtis Brown Literary and Talent Agency
 

Living people
1969 births
Alumni of University College London
English television directors
English film directors